Melahat is a Turkish feminine given name. Notable persons with that name include:

Melahat Eryurt (born 1975), Turkish footballer
Melahat Gürsel (1900-1975), fourth First Lady of Turkey
Melahat Okuyan (born 1926), Turkish bacteriologist and virologist
Melahat Ruacan (1906-1974), Turkish high court judge